Kamoliddin Tajiev (Uzbek Cyrillic: Камолиддни Тожиев; born 3 May 1983 in Jizzakh) is an Uzbek footballer who currently plays as a defender for Pakhtakor Tashkent in the Uzbek League. He is also a member of the Uzbekistan national team.

Club career
Kamoliddin Tajiev would join top tier club Pakhtakor Tashkent in the 2002 Uzbek League season where he played a minor rule as the team won the championship. After several seasons with the club he was loaned out to Sogdiana Jizzakh to gain more playing time, however while he was a regular within the team he was unable to aid them from avoiding relegation to the second tier at the end of the 2006 Uzbek League season. Upon his return to Pakhtakor he would start to become a regular within the team until in 2011 he decided to ply his trade in the Chinese Super League and clinched a contract with top tier club Jiangsu Sainty.

Honours
Pakhtakor Tashkent
Uzbek League: 2002, 2003, 2004, 2005, 2007

Jiangsu Sainty
Chinese FA Super Cup: 2013

References

External links
 

1983 births
Living people
Uzbekistani footballers
Uzbekistan international footballers
Uzbekistani expatriate footballers
Pakhtakor Tashkent FK players
Jiangsu F.C. players
Chinese Super League players
Expatriate footballers in China
Uzbekistani expatriate sportspeople in China
Footballers at the 2006 Asian Games
Association football defenders
Asian Games competitors for Uzbekistan